Following is a list of Székely settlements. The list contains the municipalities belonging to the Székely Seats in the 19th century, before the administrative reform in Hungary. The Seats were the traditional self-governing territorial units of the Transylvanian Székelys during medieval times. (Saxons were also organised in Seats.) The Seats were not part of the traditional Hungarian county system, and their inhabitants enjoyed a higher level of freedom (especially until the 18th century) than those living in the counties.

Aranyosszék (Aranyos Seat)

Csíkszék (Csík Seat)

Háromszék (Three Seats)

Marosszék (Maros Seat)

Udvarhelyszék (Udvarhely Seat)

References 

Székelys
Szekely
Szekely
Szekely